Ondrej Šima (born 4 August 1936) is a Slovak former sports shooter. He competed in the 300 metre rifle event at the 1968 Summer Olympics.

References

1936 births
Living people
Slovak male sport shooters
Olympic shooters of Czechoslovakia
Shooters at the 1968 Summer Olympics
People from Banská Bystrica District
Sportspeople from the Banská Bystrica Region